Nemuritorii (The Immortals) is a 1974 Romanian historical-adventure drama film. This film was directed by Romanian director Sergiu Nicolaescu. It was released on 22 January 1974 in Romania.

Cast
 Ion Besoiu as Costea
 Ilarion Ciobanu as Vasile
 Sergiu Nicolaescu as Captain Andrei
 Gheorghe Dinică as The Noble Man Butnaru
  as Mihăiță
  as Johanna
 Amza Pellea as Dumitru
 Colea Răutu as Iusuf Pașa
  as Earl Sarosi
 Dumitru Crăciun as Crăciun
  as Mohor
 Mircea Pașcu as Paraschiv
 Vasile Popa as One 'Nemuritor' (Immortal)
  as Maria-Christina
 Jean Constantin

See also
 List of historical drama films

References

External links
 

1974 films
Films directed by Sergiu Nicolaescu
Romanian drama films
1970s Romanian-language films
Films set in the 1610s